Paulo Alexandre Rodrigues Fonseca (born 5 March 1973) is a Portuguese professional football manager and former player who played as a central defender. He is the current head coach of French Ligue 1 club Lille.

He amassed Primeira Liga totals of 111 matches and three goals over seven seasons, representing Leça, Belenenses, Marítimo, Vitória de Guimarães and Estrela da Amadora. 

Fonseca became a manager in 2005, notably winning the 2015–16 Taça de Portugal with Braga as well as three editions of the Ukrainian Premier League with Shakhtar Donetsk. He also coached Paços de Ferreira to a best-ever third place in the 2012–13 Primeira Liga, qualifying the club for the UEFA Champions League.

Playing career
Born in Nampula, Portuguese Mozambique to a military father, Fonseca was a year old when his family relocated to Barreiro following the Carnation Revolution. He played 14 years as a senior, beginning with his adopted hometown's Barreirense in the third division and moving straight to the Primeira Liga with Leça in the 1995–96 season, starting in 21 of his league appearances as the club finished 14th and narrowly avoided relegation. In the following five years he continued in the latter competition, being first choice with Belenenses and Marítimo but only a backup with Vitória de Guimarães and Estrela da Amadora.

Fonseca retired in June 2005 at the age of 32 after a further four campaigns with Estrela, three of those spent in the Segunda Liga. In the 2003–04 campaign he participated in 15 games as the Lisbon side ranked last in the top tier, with the subsequent relegation.

Coaching career

Early years
Fonseca started coaching immediately after retiring, remaining two years at the helm of Estrela da Amadora's youths. From 2007 to 2011 he was in charge of several modest teams, notably Pinhalnovense which he led to the quarter-finals of the Taça de Portugal in both the 2009–10 and 2010–11 seasons.

In 2011–12, Fonseca was appointed at Aves in division two for his first job in the professionals, and he led the team to the third position, just two points shy of promotion.

Paços Ferreira
In his first season in charge of a top-flight team, Fonseca led Paços de Ferreira to a third-place finish after signing a two-year contract on 28 May 2012. The club consequently qualified for the play-off round of the UEFA Champions League for the first and only time in its history; in the domestic league, they only lost to champions Porto and runners-up Benfica, notably winning both games against Braga (2–0 at home, 3–2 away) and Sporting CP (1–0 on both occasions).

Paços also reached the semi-finals of the Portuguese Cup that campaign, being knocked out by Benfica.

Porto
Fonseca succeeded Vítor Pereira at Porto – winners of the last three league titles – when he joined on a two-year deal on 10 June 2013. He started his spell on a high note, winning the year's Supertaça Cândido de Oliveira after a 3–0 victory over Vitória de Guimarães which marked his first honour as a coach.

However, on 5 March 2014, following a string of poor results that left the club in the third position in the league, nine points behind leaders Benfica, Fonseca was relieved of his duties. Previously, on 12 January, he had stated that Porto would be champions in the last matchday against that opponent.

Paços return and Braga
On 11 June 2014, Fonseca returned to Paços de Ferreira. His one season back at the Estádio da Mata Real resulted in an eighth-place finish, missing out on qualification to the UEFA Europa League on the final day.

Fonseca agreed to a two-year contract with Braga on 1 July 2015. He led them to fourth position, also winning the domestic cup for the first time in 50 years with a penalty shootout victory over Porto in the final. In the Europa League, they reached the last-eight stage.

Shakhtar Donetsk

Fonseca moved abroad for the first time in his career on 31 May 2016, replacing legendary Mircea Lucescu (12 seasons) at the helm of Shakhtar Donetsk and signing a two-year contract at the Ukrainian Premier League side. He won the double in all three seasons of his spell– which earned him the distinction as the league's best coach in 2016–17.

Fonseca's side reached the round of 16 of the 2017–18 Champions League, after finishing second in the group stage following a 2–1 home defeat of Premier League club Manchester City. Having inflicted a first defeat in 29 matches of Pep Guardiola's side, he kept a promise to do his next press conference dressed as the fictional hero Zorro.

Roma
On 11 June 2019, Fonseca was appointed manager of Roma. He led the side to the fifth place in the Serie A in his first season, as well as the semi-finals of the subsequent Europa League. He announced his departure in May 2021.

Immediately after leaving Roma, Fonseca was director Fabio Paratici's top choice to be manager of Tottenham Hotspur, but the advanced negotiations were scrapped on 17 June 2021, allegedly due to tax issues. However, in an interview with The Daily Telegraph in September, the former revealed that the main reason for this was that the latter wanted to hire a more defensive-minded coach. In October, he was interviewed by Newcastle United following their Saudi-led takeover, before the interest shifted to Unai Emery and Eddie Howe; his name was then linked to a third English club, Aston Villa.

Lille
On 29 June 2022, Fonseca signed a two-year contract with French Ligue 1 club Lille. He made his debut on 7 August in a 4–1 home win over Auxerre. On 9 October, his team defeated Derby du Nord rivals Lens 1–0 also at the Stade Pierre-Mauroy. One of the best attacking sides in the first half of that season, they were praised for their stylish and slick passing game, playing in an open 4–2–3–1 formation with Benjamin André, André Gomes or Angel Gomes being deployed as central midfielders behind playmaker Rémy Cabella and lone striker Jonathan David. Following a 4–3 home victory against Monaco on 23 October, only Lyon and Paris Saint-Germain had more possession in the domestic league.

Managerial style
At Shakhtar and Roma, Fonseca preferred a 4–2–3–1 formation and an emphasis on dominating possession. At both teams, the player behind the centre forward played as a second striker; Henrikh Mkhitaryan achieved 13 goals in 2020–21 from that position. 

In a interview for French media RMC about his Lille debut, Fonseca described his managerial style as "an offensive play in order to overcome the opponent, to settle in the opponent's half and to create many scoring chances."

Personal life
Fonseca had a son and a daughter with his first wife. On 29 May 2018, he married Ukrainian television personality and producer Katerina Ostroushko (born 1991) at Lake Como, Italy; their son was born the same year. The family escaped Kyiv after the 2022 Russian invasion, travelling for 30 hours to Romania.

Managerial statistics

Honours

Manager
Porto
Supertaça Cândido de Oliveira: 2013

Braga
Taça de Portugal: 2015–16

Shakhtar Donetsk
Ukrainian Premier League: 2016–17, 2017–18, 2018–19
Ukrainian Cup: 2016–17, 2017–18, 2018–19
Ukrainian Super Cup: 2017

Individual
Ukrainian Premier League Best Coach: 2016–17

References

External links

1973 births
Living people
People from Nampula Province
Mozambican people of Portuguese descent
Sportspeople from Barreiro, Portugal
Portuguese footballers
Association football defenders
Primeira Liga players
Liga Portugal 2 players
Segunda Divisão players
F.C. Barreirense players
FC Porto players
Leça F.C. players
C.F. Os Belenenses players
C.S. Marítimo players
Vitória S.C. players
C.F. Estrela da Amadora players
Portuguese football managers
Primeira Liga managers
Liga Portugal 2 managers
C.D. Pinhalnovense managers
C.D. Aves managers
F.C. Paços de Ferreira managers
FC Porto managers
S.C. Braga managers
Ukrainian Premier League managers
FC Shakhtar Donetsk managers
Serie A managers
A.S. Roma managers
Ligue 1 managers
Lille OSC managers
Portuguese expatriate football managers
Expatriate football managers in Ukraine
Expatriate football managers in Italy
Expatriate football managers in France
Portuguese expatriate sportspeople in Ukraine
Portuguese expatriate sportspeople in Italy
Portuguese expatriate sportspeople in France